The Bridewell and Bethlehem Hospitals were two charitable foundations that were independently put into the charge of the City of London. They were brought under joint administration in 1557.

Bethlehem Hospital

The Bethlem Royal Hospital was founded in 1247 as the Priory of the New Order of our Lady of Bethlehem in the city of London during the reign of Henry III. It was established by the Bishop-elect of Bethlehem, the Italian Goffredo de Prefetti, following a donation of personal property by the London alderman and former sheriff, Simon FitzMary. The original location was in the parish of St Botolph, Bishopsgate's ward. In 1546 the Lord Mayor of London, Sir John Gresham, petitioned the crown to grant Bethlem to the city. This petition was partially successful and Henry VIII reluctantly ceded to the City of London "the custody, order and governance" of the hospital and of its "occupants and revenues". This charter came into effect in 1547. The crown retained possession of the hospital while its administration fell to the city authorities. Following a brief interval when it was placed under the management of the governors of Christ's Hospital, from 1557 Bethlem was administered by the governors of Bridewell.

Bridewell Hospital 
In 1553, Edward VI gave Bridewell Palace  to the City of London for the housing of homeless children and for the punishment of "disorderly women". 

The City took full possession in 1556 and turned the site into a prison, hospital and workrooms.

Joint administration
In 1557 the administration of Bethlem Royal Hospital became the responsibility of the Bridewell Governors. The post of President was established, with first occupant being Sir Rowland Hill in 1557.

List of presidents of the Bridewell and Bethlehem Hospitals
Sir Rowland Hill 1557–1558
Sir William Garrett 1558
Sir Rowland Hill 1559
Sir Roland Haywood 1561
Edward Gilbart 1563
Sir William Chester 1564
Sir John White 1568
Sir Lionel Duckett 1568–73
Sir Alexander Avenon 1573
Sir Lionel Duckett 1580–86
Sir William Rowe 1592
Sir William Webbe 1594
Sir Stephen Slaney 1599
Sir William Ryder 1600
Sir Leonard Halliday 1605
Sir Thomas Middleton 1613
Sir Roland Hayter 1631
George Whitman 1631
Sir John Wollaston 1643
Christopher Packe 1649
Sir Richard Brown Bt 1661
Sir James Smith 1668
Sir William Turner 1669
Sir Robert Jeffries 1689
Sir William Turner 1690
Sir Robert Jeffries 1693-
Sir Samuel Dashwood 1703
Sir Thomas Rawlinson1705
Sir William Withers 1708
Sir Samuel Garrard 1721
Sir William Humfreys, 1st Baronet (died 1735)
Humphrey Parsons 1725–1741
Robert Willimot 1741
William Benn1746
Sir Richard Glyn 1755
Sir Walter Rawlinson  1773
Brackley Kennett 1777
Brass Crosby 1782
Sir James Sanderson 1789
Sir Richard Carr Glyn 1793
Sir Peter Laurie 1833
William Taylor Copeland 1861
J E Johnson 1868
Sir James Lawrence, 1st Baronet 1868

References

1557 establishments in England
Bridewell and Bethlehem Hospitals